Hittner is a surname. Notable people with the surname include:

David Hittner (born 1939), American judge
Mark Hittner, American football judge

See also
Wittner